Harriet Mayanja-Kizza, MBChB, MMed, MSc, FACP, is a Ugandan physician, researcher, and academic administrator. She is the former Dean of Makerere University School of Medicine, the oldest medical school in East Africa, established in 1924.

Background and education
She was born in the Central Region of Uganda in the 1950s. She holds the degree of Bachelor of Medicine and Bachelor of Surgery, obtained from Makerere University in 1978. She also holds the degree of Master of Medicine in Internal Medicine, obtained in 1983, also from Makerere. She studied immunology and pathology at Case Western Reserve University in Cleveland, Ohio, USA, graduating with the degree of Master of Science in those fields in 1999. She is a Fellow of the American College of Physicians.

Career
Mayanja-Kizza has worked as a lecturer in the Department of Internal Medicine at Makerere University Medical School. She has also served as the head of the Department of Internal Medicine, both at the medical school and at Mulago National Referral Hospital, the university's teaching hospital. In November 2010, she was appointed dean of the Makerere Medical School, at Makerere University College of Health Sciences. She has presented widely at national, regional, and International conferences and has published extensively in peer journals. In 2022, she was ranked by the AD Scientific Index as the best scientist in Uganda.

Other considerations
Her area of specialization is immunology, focusing on the interaction between AIDS and tuberculosis. Her research studies, are in the areas of immunopathogenesis, and immune-modulation treatments among patients with human immunodeficiency virus infection and tuberculosis. Professor Harriet Mayanja-Kizza is a Fellow of the Uganda National Academy of Sciences.

See also
 Makerere University College of Health Sciences
 Mulago National Referral Hospital

Research 
She is a respected researcher with more than 200 publications and 9277 citations of her works as of May 2022. Some of her articles with more than 100 citations include; A blood RNA signature for tuberculosis disease risk: a prospective cohort study (2016), Outcomes of cryptococcal meningitis in Uganda before and after the availability of highly active antiretroviral therapy (2008), A study of the safety, immunology, virology, and microbiology of adjunctive etanercept in HIV-1-associated tuberculosis (2004), Impact of tuberculosis (TB) on HIV-1 activity in dually infected patients (2001), Patient and health service delay in pulmonary tuberculosis patients attending a referral hospital: a cross-sectional study (2005), Predictors of long-term viral failure among Ugandan children and adults treated with antiretroviral therapy (2007), Four-gene pan-African blood signature predicts progression to tuberculosis (2018), Sero-prevalence and risk factors for hepatitis B virus infection among health care workers in a tertiary hospital in Uganda (2010), Novel serologic biomarkers provide accurate estimates of recent Plasmodium falciparum exposure for individuals and communities (2015), Immunoadjuvant prednisolone therapy for HIV-associated tuberculosis: a phase 2 clinical trial in Uganda (2005), Combination therapy with fluconazole and flucytosine for cryptococcal meningitis in Ugandan patients with AIDS (1998), Severe sepsis in two Ugandan hospitals: a prospective observational study of management and outcomes in a predominantly HIV-1 infected population (2009), Immunological mechanisms of human resistance to persistent Mycobacterium tuberculosis infection (2018), IFN-γ-independent immune markers of Mycobacterium tuberculosis exposure (2019), Genome scan of M. tuberculosis infection and disease in Ugandans (2008), Acceptance of routine testing for HIV among adult patients at the medical emergency unit at a national referral hospital in Kampala, Uganda (2007), Diagnostic performance of a seven-marker serum protein biosignature for the diagnosis of active TB disease in African primary healthcare clinic attendees with signs and symptoms suggestive of TB (2016), The impact of early monitored management on survival in hospitalized adult Ugandan patients with severe sepsis: a prospective intervention study (2012), High T-cell immune activation and immune exhaustion among individuals with suboptimal CD4 recovery after 4 years of antiretroviral therapy in an African cohort (2011), FCRL5 Delineates Functionally Impaired Memory B Cells Associated with Plasmodium falciparum Exposure (2015), Concise gene signature for point‐of‐care classification of tuberculosis (2016), Relationship of immunodiagnostic assays for tuberculosis and numbers of circulating CD4+ T-cells in HIV infection (2010)

References

Living people
Case Western Reserve University alumni
Makerere University alumni
Ganda people
People from Central Region, Uganda
Ugandan Christians
Ugandan immunologists
Ugandan women physicians
Academic staff of Makerere University
Ugandan women academics
Year of birth missing (living people)
Fellows of Uganda National Academy of Sciences
20th-century Ugandan physicians
21st-century Ugandan physicians
21st-century Ugandan women scientists
21st-century Ugandan scientists